Heading for Tomorrow is the first studio album released by German metal band, Gamma Ray on 26 February 1990 by Noise Records. In 2002 it was re-released with a different cover as part of the Ultimate Collection box-set. This re-released version of the album has also been released separately from the box-set.

Track listing

Notes
 "Look at Yourself" only appears on the CD version of the album.
 The three bonus tracks from the 2002-release are also available on the Heaven Can Wait EP.

Personnel
Gamma Ray
 Ralf Scheepers – lead vocals
 Kai Hansen – guitars, vocals, producer
 Uwe Wessel – bass (all tracks but 4 and 5)
 Mathias Burchardt – drums (all tracks but 3)

Guest musicians
 Dirk Schlächter – bass (tracks 4, 5)
 Tommy Newton – lead guitar (track 8), backing vocals, mixing
 Tammo Vollmers – drums (track 3)
 Mischa Gerlach – keyboards, piano
 Piet Sielck – additional keyboards, backing vocals, second engineer
 Joal, Fernando Garcia, Petr Chrastina – backing vocals

Production
Ralf Krause – engineer, mixing of "Look at Yourself"
Karl-Ulrich Walterbach – executive producer

Charts

References

1990 debut albums
Gamma Ray (band) albums
Noise Records albums
Albums produced by Kai Hansen